Sarah McAuley (born 25 September 2001) is an Irish field hockey player. She competed in the 2020 Summer Olympics.

References

External links
 
 Sarah McAuley at Hockey Ireland
 
 

2001 births
Living people
Field hockey players at the 2020 Summer Olympics
Irish female field hockey players
Olympic field hockey players of Ireland